{{Infobox beauty pageant|photo=|best national costume=Wanmai Thammavong|withdraws=|returns=|next=2018|before=2015|photogenic=Stacy Biano|congeniality=|broadcaster=Channel 3 (Thailand)|caption=|venue=Pattaya, Thailand|placements=10|entrants=29|acts=Trixie MaristelaMiss International Queen 2015|presenters=|date=7 March 2016|winner=Jiratchaya Sirimongkolnawin|debuts=}}Miss International Queen 2016, the 12th Miss International Queen pageant, was held on March 6, 2016, at Pattaya City in Thailand. Trixie Maristela of the Philippines crowned her successor, Jiratchaya Sirimongkolnawin of Thailand at the end of the event. '''

Result

Special Awards

Best in Talent

Contestants 
29 contestants competed for the title.

References

External links 
 

2017 beauty pageants
2017
Beauty pageants in Thailand